Piero Toscani (28 July 1904 in Milan – 23 May 1940) was an Italian boxer who won the gold medal in the middleweight class at the 1928 Olympics, after defeating Jan Heřmánek in the final.

1928 Olympic results
Below are the results of Piero Toscani, an Italian boxer who competed in the middleweight division of the 1928 Amsterdam Olympic Games:

 Round of 32: bye
 Round of 16: defeated Ingvard Ludvigsen (Denmark) on points
 Quarterfinal: defeated Oscar Kjallander (Sweden) on points
 Semifinal: defeated Leonard Stayaert (Belgium) on points
 Final: defeated Jan Heřmánek (Czechoslovakia) on points (won gold medal)

References

External links

Piero Toscani at bpxrec

1904 births
1940 deaths
Boxers from Milan
Middleweight boxers
Olympic boxers of Italy
Boxers at the 1928 Summer Olympics
Olympic gold medalists for Italy
Olympic medalists in boxing
Italian male boxers
Medalists at the 1928 Summer Olympics